Sambomaster Kyukyou Besuto (サンボマスター究極ベスト) is an album by Japanese rock band Sambomaster.

Track listing
CD1:
 Sekai wa sore wo Ai to Yobunda ze
 Kibo no Michi
 Sekai wo Kaesasete okure yo
 Dekikkonai wo Yaranakucha
 Hikari no rock
 Seishun Kyousoukyoku
 Love song
 Utagoe yo okore
 Kimi wo Mamotte, Kimi wo Ai shite
 Utsukushiki Ningen no Hibi
 Very Special!!
 I love you
 Kimi ni Kirei no Kizuite okure
 Tegami
 Subete no Yoru to subete no Asa ni Tanbarin wo Narasu no Da
 Tsuki ni saku Hana no You ni Naru no
 Sono Nukumori ni You ga aru
CD2:
 Sayounara Baby
 Kore de Jiyuu ni natta no Da
 Netchu Jidai
 Futari
 Atarashiku Hikare
 Hito wa sore wo Jounetsu to Yobu
 Shumatsu soul
 Yogisha de Yatteki ta Aitsu
 Omoide wa Yogisha ni notte
 Itoshisa to Kokoro no Kabe
 Atarashii Asa
 Asa
 Itoshiki Hibi
 Supergirl
 Zetsubou to Yokubou to Otokonoko to Onnanoko
 Yoru ga Aketara
 Anata to Ikitai

Sambomaster albums
2011 albums